The Silodor Open Pairs national bridge championship is held at the spring American Contract Bridge League (ACBL) North American Bridge Championship (NABC).

The Silodor Open Pairs is a four session matchpoint (MP) pairs event with two qualifying and two final sessions. The event typically starts on the first Friday of the NABC. The event is open.

History
The Silodor Open Pairs is a four-session event consisting of two qualifying and two final sessions. The winners' names are engraved on the Silodor Trophy, presented in memory of Sidney Silodor, winner of the Bermuda Bowl, the McKenney Trophy and more than 30 North American championships.

Silodor, a member of the team that won the first Bermuda Bowl World Championship in 1950, won the Vanderbilt eight times, the Reisinger six times, the Spingold, the Open Pairs and the Master Mixed Teams three times each and the Mixed Pairs five times --- a record.

Silodor was an original member of the ACBL Hall of Fame, elected in the Sixties when the institution was the province of its creator, The Bridge World magazine.

The trophy was presented in 1963 in memory of Silodor and made retroactive to include winners of the event, which began in 1958.

Winners

Sources

List of previous winners, Page 8

2009 winners, Page 1

References

External links
ACBL official website

North American Bridge Championships